Thomas Stewart Townsend  (1800–1852)  was an Irish Anglican bishop in the Church of Ireland in the 19th century.

He was successively Dean of Lismore and Dean of Waterford to 1850. He became Bishop of Meath in 1850 and died in post in Málaga  on 16 September 1852. His Times obituary noted that "by his death the system of national education has lost an earnest advocate".

References

1800 births
1852 deaths
Townsend family
Deans of Lismore
Deans of Waterford
19th-century Anglican bishops in Ireland
Anglican bishops of Meath